The Orford River is a river near the southwest coast of mainland British Columbia, Canada. Its mouth is on the east side of Bute Inlet, about halfway between the head and mouth of the Inlet.

Steelhead salmon (Rainbow trout) are numerous in Orford River, providing food for many grizzly bears.

References

Rivers of British Columbia